Chah Molla may refer to:
 Chah Molla, Razavi Khorasan